The 1976 Israel Super Cup was the sixth Israel Super Cup (11th, including unofficial matches, as the competition wasn't played within the Israel Football Association in its first 5 editions, until 1969), an annual Israel football match played between the winners of the previous season's Top Division and Israel State Cup. 

The match was played between Hapoel Be'er Sheva, champions of the 1975–76 Liga Leumit and Beitar Jerusalem, winners of the 1975–76 Israel State Cup.

This was Hapoel Be'er Sheva's 2nd Israel Super Cup appearance and Beitar's first. At the match, played at Bloomfield Stadium, Beitar Jerusalem won 3–2, after extra time.

Match details

References

1976
Super Cup
Super Cup 1976
Super Cup 1976
Israel Super Cup matches